Devipur is a village in Devipur CD block in the Deoghar subdivision of the Deoghar district in the Indian state of Jharkhand.

Geography

Overview
The map shows a large area, which is a plateau with low hills, except in the eastern portion where the Rajmahal hills intrude into this area and the Ramgarh hills are there. The south-western portion is just a rolling upland. The entire area is overwhelmingly rural with only small pockets of urbanisation.

Note: The full screen map is interesting. All places marked on the map are linked in the full screen map and one can easily move on to another page of his/her choice. Enlarge the full screen map to see what else is there – one gets railway connections, many more road connections and so on.

Area

Location

In the map of Devipur CD block in the District Census Handbook, Deoghar, Devipur is shown as being part of Pathria mouza (MDDS PLCN - 212).

Demographics
According to the 2011 Census of India, Pathria had a total population of 199, of which 108  (54%) were males and 91 (46%) were females. Population in the age range 0–6 years was 28. The total number of literate persons in Pathria was 171 (69.59% of the population over 6 years).

Civic administration

Police station
There is a police station at Devipur village.

CD block HQ
Headquarters of Devipur CD block is at Devipur village.

Education
Kasturba Gandhi Balika Vidyalaya, Devipur, is a Hindi-medium girls only institution established in 2005. It has facilities for teaching from class VI to class XII.

The English-medium DAV Public School at Kendua was established in 2013 and as of 2020 is functioning from class I to class VIII.

Healthcare
The prestigious AIIMs, Deoghar, has been set up at Devipur.

References

Villages in Deoghar district